The Western Plateau is Australia's largest drainage division and is composed predominantly of the remains of the ancient rock shield of Gondwana. It covers two thirds of the continent;  of arid land, including large parts of Western Australia, South Australia, and the Northern Territory. For comparison, it is roughly the same size as the whole of continental Europe from Poland west to Portugal.

Rain rarely falls in this region and aside from a handful of permanent waterholes, surface water is absent at all times except after heavy rain. Most of the territory is flat sandy or stony desert with a sparse covering of shrubs or tussock grasses.

See also
 Australian Shield
 Great Victoria Desert
 Pilbara Craton
 Yilgarn Craton

References

Drainage basins of Australia
Plateaus of Australia
Regions of Australia